Jonny Cruz (born Jonathan Willie Hernández; December 1, 1982) is an American actor, scriptwriter, producer, filmmaker and musician. He has been featured as an actor in movies like Walking Tall: Lone Justice, Infiltrators and Haunting at the Beacon. He has also appeared on television series like General Hospital, Prison Break and Don't Trust the B---- in Apartment 23. As producer, Jonny has run films such as Small Timers, Hold, the web series Cool Wheels and plays the guitar with his musical team Power Up in Los Angeles and Hollywood, California in the United States. He is also the voice of Lúcio in the video game Overwatch and the voice of Lucas Rivera in Need for Speed Heat. His experience in filmmaking has also covered activities as producer, director, writer, editor, SFX artist, voice artist and cinematographer.

Biography

Early life
Jonny Cruz was born Jonathan Willie Hernández in El Paso, Texas on December 1, 1982 and is the son of Maritza Pagan and Orlando Hernández, younger brother of two children with his sister Sharlene. Jonny chose to use Cruz as his professional last name in honor of his Grandmother Nayda Cruz. He attended school in El Paso and studied abroad in Würzburg, Germany in early grade school. Cruz started acting and performing in his early years in the fourth grade with his first role as Brom Bones in the play Sleepy Hollow. He continued his studies and never lost the chance to keep performing at Eastwood High School and went on to study acting and filmmaking at the University of Texas at Arlington. The ability to be so completely lost in the moment and find perfection through performance and filmmaking attracted Cruz to the art form. Cruz found himself fascinated with Improv comedy performance and joined the well known Four Day Weekend Performance Team  in Fort Worth. While performing, Cruz continued to shoot short videos to showcase his comedic and technical talents.

Career
Cruz studied computer science, acting, filmmaking and communication media, all of which he used to understand the complex process of film making. His computer skills allowed him to work as web designer and his passion for acting always prompted him to audition for movie roles as they came. Cruz stated, “I loved to learn so, I would spend endless hours working on the computer learning editing software, visual FX programs, I felt that I could pretty much make a movie on my own from beginning to end after learning all the different aspects of movie making”. So in 2005, with enough knowledge on technical and theoretical aspects of movie making, Cruz made his first incursion as writer, director and producer, besides his acting role, with Cool Wheels where he co-worked with college friends Robby Storey and Kim Matula. He then went on to produce, write, act and direct Small Timers, his first feature-length film. Small Timers took six years to complete due to severe technical difficulties, and Cruz stated that completing the film was one of the hardest things he's ever had to do.

In 2013, Cruz featured as Jimmy Romero in the film Infiltraitors, his third production with Sabbatical Pictures. His first and second works with this company were Exit Speed and Haunting at the Beacon. Infiltrators was Cruz's first lead in a feature film. Also in 2013, Cruz performed Victor in the action film Gone Missing.

Since 2016, Cruz has appeared as the voice of Lúcio in the highly popular game Overwatch, and reprised the role for Heroes of the Storm.

Music
Cruz has made music for his own movies, such as Small Timers and plays the guitar and performs musical improv with his team Power Up, who with he has played shows in Los Angeles and Hollywood as well as shows at iOwest, Comedy Sportz and The Clubhouse and UCB in California.

Extra activities
Cruz teaches “Self Confidence & Improv” for famous author Neil Strauss consisting of a motivational speaking and helping people to find their best self through facing their fears, Improv being one of the tools to help gain confidence.

He also supports “A Course in Miracles”, which is a foundation for inner peace and is method of coping with fear by shifting your perspective from fear to love, parting from the statement that “fear is an illusion that we create”.

He also streams on the popular streaming platform Twitch as a side hobby. It all started on October 5, 2020 when he posted a post on Facebook were he said he is going Grand Master in the popular FPS Overwatch and needed help from players to rank up. His first stream was on October the 6th 2pm PST, he started to level up in quickplay with viewers who tuned in to see the Lúcio voice actor from their favourite game playing Overwatch. Over time he has created a loyal fanbase of viewers and friends who come regularly to his stream to chat, play games and just hang out. Now he streams each week on Tuesday, Wednesday and Thursday were he starts of the stream with Scrims (private lobby 6 versus 6) with his viewers to warm up. Right now (September 2021), he is at 3900sr which is 100sr from his goal of going Grand Master.

Filmography

Films

Shorts

Television

Video games

Web series

Music
Cruz made musical beat compilations in Small Timers. Does Musical Improv with his team Power Up, a cappella style with harmonies and beat-boxing.

Theater
Cruz played Juan Francisco “Frankie” in Charity: Part III of A Mexican Trilogy, directed by José Luis Valenzuela, starring Ofelia Medina.

References

External links

 
 
  “Haunting at the Beacon” Cast and Crew
  “Haunting at the Beacon” Release memo
   “Small Timers” AD
 
  A Course in Miracles Introduction

1982 births
Living people
American male writers
American male film actors
American male television actors
American male video game actors
American male voice actors
Film producers from Texas
People from El Paso, Texas
University of Texas at Arlington alumni
21st-century American male actors